Kwun Tong Ferry Pier is a ferry pier situated on Hoi Yuen Road, Kwun Tong, Kowloon, Hong Kong. The pier was originally situated at Ngau Tau Kok called "Ngau Tau Kok Ferry Pier", but during the 1960s, due to reclamation work, the pier was moved to Kwun Tong.

The ferry pier complex consists of three piers: a passenger ferry pier, a vehicular ferry pier and a public pier. Parts of the ground floor and upper floor of the vehicular ferry pier were used as Kwun Tong Driving School. There is a footbridge linking Kwun Tong Ferry Pier and Manulife Financial Centre.

The passenger ferry pier used to provide services to both Shau Kei Wan and North Point, but after the Shau Kei Wan service was terminated, its half of the ferry pier was converted into a supermarket. As business declined it also closed. Today it is no longer occupied, but is sometimes used as exhibition space.

There is a bus terminus, which is known as Kwun Tong Ferry, is the largest bus terminus in Kwun Tong District.

Routes
Kwun Tong Ferry Pier was formerly one of the major piers used by Hongkong and Yaumati Ferry. It provided regular car ferry and passenger ferry services to Central, North Point and Shau Kei Wan.

But with the opening of the MTR and the opening of the Eastern Harbour Crossing, both the car and passenger numbers dwindled and the ferry services were terminated. However, ferry services between Kwun Tong, North Point and Mui Wo are still operated by Hongkong and Yaumati Ferry, as vehicles with dangerous goods are prohibited from using any one of the cross harbour tunnels.

Today, Fortune Ferry still provides a regular service between Kwun Tong and North Point via the Kai Tak Runway Park Pier. Foot passenger fare HK$5, bicycles $5.50; the journey time is approximately 12 minutes.

Coral Sea Ferry also provides a regular Kai-to ferry service between Kwun Tong Public Pier and Sai Wan Ho every half hour, fare HK$9; the journey time is approximately 15 minutes.

Gallery

Filming location
The 1999 film The Legend of Speed by Andrew Lau, featuring Ekin Cheng and Cecilia Cheung, used the pier as the location for the starting/ending point for the car racing scenes.

References

External links

 Fortune Ferry
 Fun in Kwun Tong - Kwun Tong Pier Coast

Piers in Hong Kong
Water transport in Hong Kong
Victoria Harbour
Kwun Tong